The 1840 United States presidential election in Arkansas took place between October 30 and December 2, 1840, as part of the 1840 United States presidential election. Voters chose three representatives, or electors to the Electoral College, who voted for President and Vice President.

Arkansas voted for the Democratic candidate, Martin Van Buren, over Whig candidate William Henry Harrison. Van Buren won Arkansas by a margin of 12.84%.

Results

See also
 United States presidential elections in Arkansas

References

Arkansas
1840
1840 Arkansas elections